The 2013–14 season is Dnipro's 23rd Ukrainian Premier League season, and their fourth season under manager Juande Ramos. They ended the season in Round of 32 of the UEFA Europa League, where they were eliminated by Tottenham Hotspur; they were excluded from the Ukrainian Cup for failing to attend their game.

Following the compulsory winter break the championship was due to resume on 1 March 2014, but due to the civil unrest in the country after the riots in Kyiv and continuing on with the Crimean crisis, the Premier League delayed the start of the spring stage. A decision was made by the Ukrainian Premier League to resume the competition on 15 March.

Squad

Out on loan

Transfers

Summer

In:

 

Out:

Winter

In:

Out:

Competitions

Ukrainian Premier League

Results

League table

Ukrainian Cup

UEFA Europa League

Play-off

Group stage

Knockout phase

Squad statistics

Appearances and goals

|-
|colspan="14"|Players away from the club on loan:
|-
|colspan="14"|Players who appeared for Dnipro who left the club during the season:
|}

Goal scorers

Disciplinary record

Notes

References

External links
 Official website

Dnipro Dnipropetrovsk
FC Dnipro seasons
Dnipro Dnipropetrovsk